Kip Hill is a village in County Durham, in England. It is situated directly to the north of Stanley, near Shield Row.

It has two pubs, the Blue Bell Inn and the Ball Alley* (*formerly known as the 'Shield Row Hotel'1)

2The 3rd Edition Ordnance Survey map of 1921 The area was once known as Kiphill but sometime between 1895 and 1898 this changed to the current Kip Hill.

Villages in County Durham
Stanley, County Durham